Modjo were a French house musical duo formed in Paris in 1999. The duo was made up of producer Romain Tranchart (born 9 June 1976) and vocalist Yann Destagnol (Yann Destal; born 14 July 1978). They had major success in 2000 with their hit single "Lady (Hear Me Tonight)".

Biography
Romain Tranchart moved with his family to Algeria and Mexico, to finally live in Brazil. There, he started learning the guitar, finding inspiration through jazz classics.

At that time he became a fan of house music, influenced by DJ Sneak, Ian Pooley, and Daft Punk. He released his first house single as Funk Legacy titled "What You're Gonna Do, Baby" on Vertigo Records (FR) in 1998. Later, he decided to enter the American School of Modern Music in Paris, the French division of the Berklee School of Music.

Also Parisian, Yann learned to play flute and clarinet when he was a small child. As he aged he became deeply influenced by the Beatles, the Beach Boys, David Bowie and other pop acts. He started to play drums by emulating them. He also learned to play the piano and the guitar. He later bought himself a four-track recording machine and started songwriting and singing. Fascinated more by voices than by charismatic band leaders, he liked bands such as Aerosmith, The Police and Queen and lately became a great fan of R&B divas.

After being a drummer and sometimes-vocalist in a few bands, he met Romain in 1998, and the partnership was born. The two quickly began recording, and from those sessions came "Lady (Hear Me Tonight)". The single got recognition later on in 2000. It is a "French-flavour" house track with heavy pop and disco influences, which featured a sample from Chic's "Soup for One". The track became an instant number-one across Europe, and was followed up by other singles "Chillin'", "What I Mean" and "No More Tears". Their live version of the band was named Modjo Band, which saw the duo being accompanied by guitars, bass and drums.

After "No More Tears" and "On Fire", they started their respective solo careers, with Romain Tranchart remixing songs from various artists like Res ("Golden Boys"), Shaggy ("Sexy Lady"), Mylène Farmer ("California") and post producing the likes of Everynote's "Once Upon a Time".  Yann Destal's released a Queen-esque album, titled The Great Blue Scar , reaching some success in France.

Awards and nominations
{| class="wikitable sortable plainrowheaders" 
|-
! scope="col" | Award
! scope="col" | Year
! scope="col" | Category
! scope="col" | Nominee(s)
! scope="col" class="unsortable"| 
|-
! scope="row"|International Dance Music Awards
| 2001
| Best House/Garage 12"
| "Lady (Hear Me Tonight)"
| 
|-
! scope="row"| MTV Europe Music Awards
| 2000
| Best French Act
| Themselves
| 
|-
! scope="row" rowspan=2|Smash Hits Poll Winners Party
| rowspan=2|2000
| Best Dance Choon
| "Lady (Hear Me Tonight)"
| 
|-
| Best Dance/Solo Act
| rowspan=2|Themselves
| 
|-
! scope="row"|Top of the Pops Awards
| 2003
| Band of the Year
|

Discography

Studio albums

Singles

See also
List of number-one dance hits (United States)
List of artists who reached number one on the US Dance chart

References

External links
 
 Yann Destagnol (Yann Destal) Twitter

Electronic music duos
English-language singers from France
French alternative rock groups
French house music groups
French musical duos
MTV Europe Music Award winners
Musical groups established in 1998
Musical groups from Paris
Nu-disco musicians